Busan Bay is a bay located in the southern Busan, South Korea.

See also
Port of Busan

References

Bays of South Korea
Landforms of Busan
Tourist attractions in Busan